Cecil Godfrey Murgatroyd (22 May 1958 – 21 May 2001) was an Australian politician, musician, and comedian. He was known for being involved in New Zealand national politics along with Australian Federal and State politics, and for his role in the 1998 Australian Constitutional convention. From 1981 until his death in 2001, he was generally associated with running and standing as a candidate for two non-serious parties, the Imperial British Conservative Party (IBCP) and the McGillicuddy Serious Party (McGSP), which operated in both countries. Murgatroyd's platforms were typically absurdist and of a 'pataphysical nature.

Murgatroyd was initially active in New Zealand politics in the early 1980s as a candidate for the (then) Wizard of Christchurch's IBCP and as the founder of the Waikato Cavalry Regiment of Alf's Imperial Army in the city of Hamilton.

In 1982 he moved to Melbourne, where he set up the Australian headquarters of the McGillicuddy Serious Party in 1984. After his move to Australia, he stood against, among others, Prime Minister Bob Hawke in two federal elections in the 1980s and 1990s. Bob Hawke likened him to the rear end of a donkey. 
He often returned to New Zealand to contest parliamentary elections, using tactics he described as being designed for "making elections interesting." In 1990 the McGillicuddy Serious Party invited him back to New Zealand to contest the seat of Christchurch North against New Zealand Prime Minister Mike Moore. In this campaign, he described himself as the McGSP's "Prime Ministerial specialist" due to his experience in Australia. 
Murgatroyd's aim in life was to be the first ever election candidate not to collect even one single vote, a record he hoped to achieve upon his return to New Zealand.

Murgatroyd was also involved in the Australian Constitutional Convention, being a candidate under the ticket "Queen Anne of Australia".

In his campaign as a candidate in the 1998 Victorian state election, Murgatroyd described himself as "a holy Prophet for the Senate". He proposed that new migrants would have to pass batting, bowling and fielding tests to assess their cricket skills, to improve Australia's future sporting prospects.
He was diagnosed with cancer of the Bile Duct in 1999 and died in 2001 in Melbourne.

The Other Wankers 
Murgatroyd was a musician and a comedian, composing his own lyrics to parodies of popular tunes and delighting audiences on university campuses where he performed for O-Week and other occasions.

In 1988 he teamed up with drummer Steve Danko and bass guitarist Bruce Armstrong to form The Other Wankers, a band devoted to promoting Sexual Self-Satisfaction, ostensibly as a way of combating AIDS. This project included the sale of T-shirts with TOW logos, badges bearing slogans such as "stay a virgin" and "get a grip", "pirate quality recordings" on cassette (sold in plain brown wrappers), and the Wank Art Colouring Book, a crudely produced A4-size booklet of clumsy pornographic line drawings by visual artist E. M. Christensen. TOW was billed as "the only band with its own full-time artist", a blatant exaggeration in keeping with Murgatroyd's over-the-top image.

With songs describing the joy and advantages of masturbation, combined with surreal and sometimes sexually explicit images projected on a screen behind the stage, it is hardly surprising TOW had difficulty finding venues. The name and subtext in many of the lyrics suggesting that most successful musicians were wankers ensured few other bands were interested in sharing the bill with them. The Other Wankers lasted barely two years before Murgatroyd was deserted by his band members, both musicians with serious careers elsewhere, and became a musical, as well as a sexual soloist.

He continued his mission, forming the solo act Anti-Sex Police, playing heavy-metal riffs on the ukulele as if it were a guitar.

Murgatroyd's one great regret was that he never made a professional-quality recording of his music, and, although there are photographs of him in his many different guises, very little video footage of his performances survives.

References

External links
 
 

1958 births
2001 deaths
Australian fringe and underground culture
Practical jokes
McGillicuddy Serious Party politicians
Unsuccessful candidates in the 1999 New Zealand general election
Unsuccessful candidates in the 1981 New Zealand general election
Deaths from cancer in Victoria (Australia)